Mazer is a video game developed and published by American Laser Games in arcades as well as the 3DO.

Gameplay 

Mazer is an isometric shooter with a three-quarter perspective.

Plot

Development and release

Reception 

Next Generation reviewed the 3DO version of the game, rating it one star out of five, and stated that "this title gives you the most frustrating gaming experience you can remember [...] The CD might be suitable for use as a coaster, but that's about it."

References

External links 
 Mazer at GameFAQs
 Mazer at Giant Bomb
 Mazer at Killer List of Videogames
 Mazer at MobyGames

1995 video games
3DO Interactive Multiplayer games
American Laser Games games
Arcade video games
Run and gun games
Science fiction video games
Video games developed in the United States
Video games with isometric graphics